Charles Toubé (22 January 1958 – 4 August 2016) was a Cameroonian professional footballer. He competed for the Cameroon national football team at the 1982 FIFA World Cup as a winger.

See also
1982 FIFA World Cup squads

References 

  

1958 births
2016 deaths
Footballers from Yaoundé
Tonnerre Yaoundé players
Cameroonian footballers
Cameroon international footballers
Olympic footballers of Cameroon
Footballers at the 1984 Summer Olympics
1982 FIFA World Cup players
1982 African Cup of Nations players
1984 African Cup of Nations players
Africa Cup of Nations-winning players
Association football midfielders